Shaker Ahmed Kamal (born 15 June 1977) is a former Bangladeshi cricketer who played in one One Day International in 1999.

References

1977 births
Living people
Bangladesh One Day International cricketers
Bangladeshi cricketers
Khulna Division cricketers
People from Kushtia District